Orton Island is an island about 1 km southeast of Cape Grenville in the Great Barrier Reef Marine Park Queensland, Australia, in Temple Bay about 200 km northeast of Kutini-Payamu National Park and Lockhart River in the Cape York Peninsula. It is around 11 hectares or 0.11 square km in size.

This island is part of the Home Islands.

References

Islands on the Great Barrier Reef
Great Barrier Reef Marine Park